William Horatio Redvers Prouse (1900-1984) was an English footballer who played as an inside forward for Rochdale and Fulham.

Career Statistics

References

English footballers
Rochdale A.F.C. players
Fulham F.C. players
1900 births
1984 deaths
Association football inside forwards